Davis is the most populous city in Yolo County, California. Located in the Sacramento Valley region of Northern California, the city had a population of 66,850 in 2020, not including the on-campus population of the University of California, Davis, which was over 9,400 (not including students' families) in 2016.  there were 38,369 students enrolled at the university.

History 
Davis sits on land that originally belonged to the Indigenous Patwin, a southern branch of Wintun people, who were killed or forced from their lands by the 1830s as part of the California Genocide through a combination of mass murders, smallpox and other diseases, and both Mexican and American systems of Indigenous slavery. Patwin burial grounds have been found across Davis, including on the site of the UC Davis Mondavi Center. After the killing and expulsion of the Patwin, territory that eventually became Davis emerged from one of California's most complicated, corrupt land grants, Laguna de Santos Callé.  The 1852 Land Commission concurred with US Attorneys who argued that the grant was "fraudulent in all its parts," and in his 1860 District Court ruling Justice Ogden Hoffman observed that "It is impossible to contemplate without disgust the series of perjuries which compose the record" of the land grant. Nevertheless, Jerome C. Davis, a prominent farmer and one of the early claimants to land in Laguna de Santos Callé, lobbied all the way to the United States Congress in order to retain the land that eventually became Davis. Davis became a depot on the Southern Pacific Railroad in 1868, when it was named "Davisville" after Jerome C. Davis. However, the post office at Davisville shortened the town name to "Davis" in 1907. The name stuck, and the city of Davis was incorporated on March 28, 1917.

From its inception as a farming community, Davis is known primarily for its contributions to agricultural policy along with veterinary care and animal husbandry. Following the passage of the University Farm Bill in 1905 by the California State Legislature, Governor George Pardee selected Davis out of 50 other sites as the future home to the University of California's University Farm, officially opening to students in 1908. The farm, later renamed the Northern Branch of the College of Agriculture in 1922, was upgraded to become the seventh UC general campus, the University of California, Davis, in 1959.

Geography and environment

Location
Neighboring towns include Dixon, Winters, Woodland, and West Sacramento.

The topography is flat, which has helped Davis to become known as a haven for bicyclists.

Climate 
The Davis climate resembles that of nearby Sacramento and is typical of California's Central Valley Mediterranean climate region: warm and dry in the spring, summer and autumn, and cool and wet in the winter. It is classified as a Köppen Csa climate. The Delta Breeze, a flow of cool marine air originating from the Pacific Ocean via San Francisco Bay and the Sacramento–San Joaquin River Delta, frequently provides relief in the evening.

Thick ground fog called tule fog settles into Davis during late fall and winter. This fog can be dense, with visibility nearly zero. As in other areas of northern California, the tule fog is a leading cause of road accidents in the winter season.

The bulk of rain occurs between about mid-November to mid-March, with typically no precipitation falling from mid-June to mid-September.

Neighborhoods
Davis is internally divided by two freeways (Interstate 80 and State Route 113), a north–south railroad (California Northern), an east–west mainline (Union Pacific) and several major streets. The city is unofficially divided into six main districts made up of smaller neighborhoods (often originally named as housing subdivisions):

 Central Davis, north of Fifth Street and Russell Boulevard, south of Covell Blvd., east of SR 113, and west of the railroad tracks running along G Street. Within these boundaries is the officially denoted neighborhood of Old North Davis, which is sometimes also considered part of Downtown.
 Downtown Davis, roughly the numbered-and-lettered grid north of I-80, south of Fifth Street, east of A Street, and west of the railroad tracks, including the Aggie Village and Olive Drive areas. 
 East Davis, north of I-80, south of Covell Blvd., and east of the railroad tracks. It includes the older, 'inner' East Davis of lettered streets and neighborhoods such as Davis Manor, Chestnut, and Rancho Yolo, as well as more distinctly identified (in some cases walled-in) subdivisions such as Mace Ranch, Lake Alhambra Estates, and Wildhorse. 
 North Davis, north of Covell Blvd. North Davis includes Covell Park, Senda Nueva, Northstar, and North Davis Farms.
 South Davis, south of I-80, and includes Willowbank. El Macero, California, although outside the city limits, is sometimes considered part of South Davis; El Macero is part of the Davis Joint Unified School District, and El Macero children who attend public schools attend Davis' public schools. 
 West Davis, north of I-80 and west of SR 113. West Davis includes Westwood, Evergreen, Aspen, Stonegate (west of Lake Boulevard and including Stonegate Lake and the Stonegate Country Club) and the eco-friendly Village Homes development, known for its solar-powered houses.

The University of California, Davis is located south of Russell Boulevard and west of A Street and then south of 1st Street. The land occupied by the university is not incorporated within the boundaries of the city of Davis and lies within both Yolo and Solano Counties.

Environment 
Local energy planning began in Davis after the energy crisis of 1973. A new building code promoted energy efficiency. Energy use in buildings decreased dramatically and in 1981 Davis citizens won a $100,000 prize from utility PG&E, for cutting electricity use during the summer peak.

On November 14, 1984, the Davis City Council declared the city to be a nuclear-free zone. In 1998, the City passed a "Dark Skies" ordinance in an effort to reduce light pollution in the night sky.

In 2013, Davis became part of the state Cool Roof Initiative with the "CoolDavis" campaign, requiring all new roofing projects to meet Cool Roof Rating Council (CRRC) requirements, including the installation of light-colored roofs. The aim is to reflect more sunlight back into space via the albedo effect, and reduce the amount of heat absorbed in hopes of limiting climate change.

Demographics

Davis is part of the Sacramento–Arden-Arcade–Roseville Metropolitan Statistical Area.

2010
The 2010 United States Census reported that Davis had a population of 65,622. The racial makeup of Davis was 42,571 (64.9%) White, 1,528 (2.3%) African American, 339 (0.5%) Native American, 14,355 (21.9%) Asian, 136 (0.2%) Pacific Islander, 3,121 (4.8%) from other races, and 3,572 (5.4%) from two or more races. Hispanic or Latino of any race were 8,172 persons (12.5%).

In 2006, Davis was ranked as the second most educated city (in terms of the percentage of residents with graduate degrees) in the US by CNN Money Magazine, after Arlington County, Virginia.

Davis' Asian population of 14,355 was apportioned among 1,631 Indian Americans, 6,395 Chinese Americans, 1,560 Korean Americans, 1,185 Vietnamese Americans, 1,033 Filipino Americans, 953 Japanese Americans, and 1,598 other Asian Americans.

Davis' Hispanic and Latino population of 8,172 was apportioned among 5,618 Mexican American, 221 Puerto Rican American, 80 Cuban American, and 2,253 other Hispanic and Latino.

The Census reported that 63,522 people (96.8% of the population) lived in households, 1,823 (2.8%) lived in non-institutionalized group quarters, and 277 (0.4%) were institutionalized.

There were 24,873 households, of which 6,119 (24.6%) had children under the age of 18 living in them, 9,343 (37.6%) were opposite-sex married couples living together, 1,880 (7.6%) had a female householder with no husband present, and 702 (2.8%) had a male householder with no wife present. There were 1,295 (5.2%) unmarried opposite-sex partnerships, and 210 (0.8%) same-sex married couples or partnerships. 5,952 households (23.9%) were made up of individuals, and 1,665 (6.7%) had someone living alone who was 65 years of age or older. The average household size was 2.55. There were 11,925 families (47.9% of all households); the average family size was 2.97.

The population age and sex distribution was 10,760 people (16.4%) under the age of 18, 21,757 people (33.2%) aged 18 to 24, 14,823 people (22.6%) aged 25 to 44, 12,685 people (19.3%) aged 45 to 64, and 5,597 people (8.5%) who were 65 years of age or older. The median age was 25.2 years. For every 100 females, there were 90.5 males. For every 100 females age 18 and over, there were 88.0 males.

The homeowner vacancy rate was 0.9%; the rental vacancy rate was 3.5%. 27,594 people (42.0% of the population) lived in owner-occupied housing units and 35,928 people (54.7%) lived in rental housing units.

2000
As of the United States 2000 Census, there were 60,308 people, 22,948 households, and 11,290 families residing in the city. The racial composition of the city was 70.07% White, 2.35% Black or African American, 0.67% Native American, 17.5% Asian, 0.24% Pacific Islander, 4.26% from other races, and 4.87% from two or more races. 9.61% of the population were Hispanic or Latino of any race.

There were 22,948 households, of which 26.4% had children under the age of 18 living with them, 38.3% were married couples living together, 8.2% had a female householder with no husband present, and 50.8% were non-families. 25.0% of all households were composed of individuals, and 5.2% had someone living alone who was 65 years of age or older. The average household size was 2.50 and the average family size was 3.00.

In the city, the population age distribution was 18.6% under the age of 18, 30.9% from 18 to 24, 27.1% from 25 to 44, 16.7% from 45 to 64, and 6.6% who were 65 years of age or older. The median age was 25 years. For every 100 females, there were 91.2 males. For every 100 females age 18 and over, there were 87.8 males.

The median income for a household in the city was $42,454, and the median income for a family was $74,051. Males had a median income of $51,189 versus $36,082 for females. The per capita income for the city was $22,937. About 5.4% of families and 24.5% of the population were below the poverty line, including 6.8% of those under age 18 and 2.8% of those age 65 or over.

This city of approximately 62,000 people abuts a university campus of 32,000 students. Although the university's land is not incorporated within the city, many students live off-campus in the city.

Economy

The California Northern Railroad is based in Davis.

Top employers
According to the city's 2020 Comprehensive Annual Financial Report, the top employers in the city are:

Davis Dollars
A community currency scheme was in use in Davis, called Davis Dollars.

Bicycling

Bicycling has been one of the most popular modes of transportation in Davis for decades, particularly among school-age children and UC Davis students. In 2010, Davis became the new home of the United States Bicycling Hall of Fame.

Bicycle infrastructure became a political issue in the 1960s, culminating in the election of a pro-bicycle majority to the City Council in 1966. By the early 1970s, Davis became a pioneer in the implementation of cycling facilities. As the city expands, new facilities are usually mandated. As a result, Davis residents today enjoy an extensive network of bike lanes, bike paths, and grade-separated bicycle crossings. The flat terrain and temperate climate are also conducive to bicycling.

In 2005 the Bicycle-Friendly Community program of the League of American Bicyclists recognized Davis as the first Platinum Level city in the US In March 2006, Bicycling Magazine named Davis the best small town for cycling in its compilation of "America's Best Biking Cities." Bicycling appears to be declining among Davis residents: from 1990 to 2000, the US Census Bureau reported a decline in the fraction of commuters traveling by bicycle, from 22 percent to 15 percent. This resulted in the reestablishment of the city's Bicycle Advisory Commission and creation of advocate groups such as "Davis Bicycles!". In 2016, Fifth Street, a main road in Davis was converted from four lanes to two lanes to allow for bicycle lanes and encourage more bicycling.

In 1996, 2001, 2006, and 2009 the UC Davis "Cal Aggie Cycling" Team won the national road cycling competition. The team also competes off-road and on the track, and has competed in the national competitions of these disciplines. In 2007, UC Davis also organized a record breaking bicycle parade numbering 822 bicycles.

Sights and culture

Whole Earth Festival 
A continuous stream of bands, speakers and various workshops occurs throughout Mother's Day weekend on each of Whole Earth Festival's (WEF) three stages and other specialty areas. The WEF is organized entirely by UC Davis students, in association with the Associated Students of UC Davis and the university.

Celebrate Davis 
Celebrate Davis is the annual free festival held by the Davis Chamber of Commerce. It features booths by Davis businesses, live music, food vendors, live animals, activities like rock climbing and zip-line. It concludes with fireworks after dark. Parking is problematic, so most people ride their bikes and use the free valet parking.

Picnic Day 

Picnic Day is an annual event at the University of California, Davis and is always held on the third Saturday in April. It is the largest student-run event in the US. Picnic Day starts off with a parade, which features the UC Davis California Aggie Marching Band-uh!, and runs through campus and around downtown Davis and ends with the Battle of the Bands, which lasts until the last band stops playing (sometimes until 2 am). There are over 150 free events and over 50,000 attend every year. Other highlights include: the Dachshund races, a.k.a. the Doxie Derby, held in the Pavilion; the Davis Rock Challenge, the Chemistry Magic Show, and the sheep dog trials. Many departments have exhibits and demonstrations, such as the Cole Facility, which until recently showed a fistulated cow (a cow that has been fitted with a plastic portal (a "fistula") into its digestive system to observe digestion processes). Its name was "Hole-y Cow".

Davis Transmedia Art Walk 
The Davis Transmedia Art Walk is a free—self-guided—public art tour includes 23 public murals, 16 sculptures, and 15 galleries and museums all in downtown Davis and the University of Davis campus. A free Davis Art Walk map serves as a detailed guide to the entire collection. The art pieces are all within walking distance of each other. The walk is a roughly circuitous path that can be completed within an hour or two. Every piece of art on the Art Walk has been embedded with an RFID chip. Using a cellphone that supports this technology, you access multimedia files that relate to each work. You can even leave a comment or "burn your own message" for other visitors to see. Artist hosted tours are held on the weekend by appointment only. To pick up a copy of the Davis Art Walk map, visit the Yolo County Visitors Bureau (132 E St., Suite 200; (530) 297–1900) or the John Natsoulas Center for the Arts (521 1st St.; (530) 756–3938).

Manetti Shrem Museum of Art 

The Manetti Shrem Museum of Art, located on the UC Davis campus, opened on November 13, 2016, and carries on the legacy of the university's world-renowned first generation art faculty, which contributed to innovations in conceptual, performance and video art in the 1960s and 70s. The museum has generated nationwide attention with exhibits by artists such as Wayne Thiebaud, Bruce Nauman, John Cage, and Robert Arneson as well as its striking architecture, featuring a 50,000 square-foot “Grand Canopy” of perforated aluminum triangular beams, supported by 40 steel columns. Every year the museum exhibits works by graduating art students. The museum is free and hosts lecture series and events throughout the year, as well as weekend art studio activities for all ages.

Mondavi Center 

The Mondavi Center, located on the UC Davis campus, is one of the biggest non-seasonal attractions in Davis. The Mondavi Center is a theater which hosts many world-class touring acts, including star performers such as Yo-Yo Ma, Yitzhak Perlman and Wynton Marsalis, and draws a large audience from Sacramento.

UC Davis Arboretum 

The UC Davis Arboretum is an arboretum and botanical garden. Plants from all over the world grow in different sections of the park. There are notable oak and native plant collections and a small redwood grove. A small waterway spans the arboretum along the bed of the old North Fork of Putah Creek. Occasionally herons, kingfishers, and cormorants can be seen around the waterways, as well as the ever-present ducks. Tours of the arboretum led by volunteer naturalists are often held for grade-school children.

The Domes 
The Domes, (AKA Baggins End Innovative Housing), is an on-campus cooperative housing community designed by project manager Ron Swenson and future student-residents in 1972. Consisting of 14 polyurethane foam-insulated fiberglass domes and located in the Sustainable Research Area at the western end of Orchard Road, it is governed by its 26 UCD student residents. It is one of the few student co-housing cooperative communities in the US, and is an early example of the modern-day growing tiny house movement. The community has successfully resisted several threats to its continuation over the years.

Farmers Market
The Davis Farmers Market is held every Wednesday evening and Saturday morning. Participants sell a range of fruits and vegetables, baked goods, dairy and meat products (often from certified organic farms), crafts, and plants and flowers. From April to October, the market hosts Picnic in the Park, with musical events and food sold from restaurant stands.
The Davis Farmers Market won first place in the 2009, and second place in the 2010 America's Favorite Farmers Markets held by the American Farmland Trust under the large Farmers market classification.

Media
Davis has one newspaper, The Davis Enterprise, a thrice-weekly founded in 1897. UC Davis also has a weekly newspaper called The California Aggie which covers campus, local and national news. Davis Media Access, a community media center, is the umbrella organization of television station DCTV. There are also numerous commercial stations broadcasting from nearby Sacramento. Davis has two community radio stations: KDVS 90.3 FM, on the University of California campus, and KDRT 95.7 FM, a subsidiary of Davis Media Access and one of the first low-power FM radio stations in the United States. Davis has the world's largest English-language local wiki, DavisWiki. In 2006, The People's Vanguard of Davis began news reporting about the city of Davis, the Davis Joint Unified School District, the county of Yolo, and the Sacramento area.

Toad Tunnel 

Davis' Toad Tunnel is a wildlife crossing that was constructed in 1995 and has drawn much attention over the years, including a mention on The Daily Show. Because of the building of an overpass, animal lovers worried about toads being killed by cars commuting from South Davis to North Davis, since the toads traveled from one side of a dirt lot (which the overpass replaced) to the reservoir at the other end. After much controversy, a decision was made to build a toad tunnel, which runs beneath the Pole Line Road overpass which crosses Interstate 80. The project cost $14,000, .

Davis Food Coop 
The Davis Food Coop is a Davis institution. Founded in 1972, this cooperative is presently owned and operated by over 9,000 members and families of the Davis Community. The Coop is a full service supermarket that has championed organic, healthy eating in the community, sponsoring community events including summer programs for children, cooking classes, and many other activities.

Education

University of California

The University of California, Davis, or UC Davis, a campus of the University of California, had a 2019 Fall enrollment of 38,369 students. UC Davis has a dominant influence on the social and cultural life of the town.

D-Q University

This is just west of Davis near the Yolo County Airport. About  to the west, the Road 31 exit from Interstate 505 is marked with cryptic signage, "DQU." NAD83 coordinates for the campus are 

The college closed in 2005. The curriculum was said to include heritage and traditional American Indian ceremonies. The  and 5 buildings were formerly a military reservation according to a National Park Service publication, Five Views. The full name of the school is included here so that readers can accurately identify the topic. According to some tribal members, use of the spelled-out name of the university can be offensive. People who want to be culturally respectful refer to the institution as D-Q University. Tribal members in appropriate circumstances may use the full name.

Other colleges
An off-campus branch of Sacramento City College is located in Davis. The satellite is located in West Village, an area built by UC Davis to house students and others affiliated with the university.

Public schools
Davis' public school system is administrated by the Davis Joint Unified School District.

The city has nine public elementary schools (North Davis, Birch Lane, Pioneer Elementary, Patwin, Cesar Chavez, Robert E. Willett, Marguerite Montgomery, Fred T. Korematsu at Mace Ranch, and Fairfield Elementary (which is outside the city limits but opened in 1866 and is Davis Joint Unified School District's oldest public school)). Davis has one school for independent study (Davis School for Independent Study), three public junior high schools (Ralph Waldo Emerson, Oliver Wendell Holmes, and Frances Harper), one main high school (Davis Senior High School), one alternative high school (Martin Luther King High School), and a small project based high school (Leonardo da Vinci High School). Cesar Chavez is a Spanish immersion school, with no English integration until the third grade. The junior high schools contain grades 7 through 9. Due to a decline in the school-age population in Davis, two of the elementary schools in south Davis may have their district boundaries changed, or magnet programs may be moved to equalize enrollment. Valley Oak was closed after the 2007–08 school year, and their campus was granted to Da Vinci High (which had formerly been located in the back of Davis Senior High's campus) and a special-ed preschool. On average, class size is about 25 students: 1 teacher.

At one time, Chavez and Willett were incorporated together to provide elementary education K–6 to both English-speaking and Spanish immersion students in West Davis. César Chávez served grades K–3 and was called West Davis Elementary, and Robert E. Willett (named for a long-time teacher at the school, now deceased) served grades 4–6 and was known as West Davis Intermediate. Willett now serves K–6 English-speaking students, and Chavez supports the Spanish immersion program for K–6.

Private schools
 Davis Waldorf School (Pre-K–8)

Notable people

These are some notable Davis residents, other than UC Davis faculty who were not previously from Davis.

 Karin Argoud, actress
 Samuel G. Armistead, anthropologist and linguist
 Ruth Asmundson, former mayor of Davis
 Peter S. Beagle, author, The Last Unicorn
 Eric Beavers, American football quarterback
 Robert F. Berkhofer, historian
 William G. Burrill, Episcopal bishop
 Cathy Carr, American Olympic swimmer
 Robert Todd Carroll (born 1945), publisher of The Skeptic's Dictionary and fellow for Committee for Skeptical Inquiry
 Alexandra Chalupa, American pro-Ukrainian activist
 Joseph Ballinger Chiles, trail blazer and early pioneer
 Tony Cline Jr., NFL tight end
 Antoinette Clinton, aka Butterscotch, musician
 Kim Conley, 2012 Olympian, track and field
 Ross Cordy, archaeologist
 Joe Craven, musician
 Denise Curry, basketball player
 Jerome C. Davis, state figure and pioneer, and namesake of Davis
 Malachi Davis, sprinter, Olympian
 Josh Davis, aka DJ Shadow, famous for his critically acclaimed sample based instrumental hip-hop
 Cecilia Dean, fashion model and entrepreneur
 Theodosius Dobzhansky, Russian-American geneticist and evolutionary biologist
 Delaine Eastin, former California State Superintendent of Public Instruction
 Tony Fields, actor, dancer; Davis High School alumnus. Fields is best known in his tenure as a Solid Gold Dancer (1979–1984) and his film roles of Alan DeLuca in the 1985 movie version of A Chorus Line and Sammi Curr in the 1986 cult horror film Trick Or Treat.
 Jason Fisk, former NFL defensive tackle
 Karen Joy Fowler, author
 Rebecca Fransway, author and poet
 Michael Franti, musician
 Nick Frentz, politician, member of the Minnesota Senate
 Todd Gogulski, former professional bicycle road racer and TV commentator for Universal Sports
 John Lawrence Goheen, American missionary, educator and administrator, agriculturist, social worker, and writer
 Carol Greider, molecular biologist and Nobel Laureate (at Johns Hopkins), raised in Davis
 Myril Hoag, MLB outfielder, three-time World Series champion
 Rita Hosking, musician
 Winnifred Hudson, painter
 Nyjah Huston, professional skateboarder
Katie Kitamura, author
 John Lescroart, author
 John Lieswyn, American racing cyclist
 Ladule Lako LoSarah is an American-born South Sudanese international footballer currently with FC Inter Leipzig of the German NOFV-Oberliga.
 Deborah Madison, chef, author
 Mike May, entrepreneur and athlete, regained sight after decades of complete blindness
 Jonna Mazet, epidemiologist
 Barry Melton, musician
 Gina Miles, 2008 Beijing Olympic silver medalist, equestrian
 Scott Miller, pop musician
 Hasan Minhaj, comedian 
 Jennifer Moffitt, politician
 Paul Moller, engineer and developer of the Moller Skycar
 Rachel Moore, president and CEO of the Los Angeles Music Center
 Freddie Muller, Major League Baseball infielder
 Dave Nachmanoff, musician
 Gabe Newell, co-founder of Valve
 Iyabo Obasanjo, Nigerian politician
 Thretton Palamo, American rugby union player
 Dickie Peterson, musician
 Orange Phelps, Oregon businessman and politician
 Kim Stanley Robinson, science-fiction author; famous works include Mars trilogy.
 Stephen Robinson, astronaut (received bachelor's degree from UC Davis, 1978)
 Beth Rodden, professional rock climber
 Halsey Rodman, artist
 Ray Rohwer, Major League Baseball outfielder
 Ed Ross, tintype photographer and lawyer
 Paul Scheuring, screenwriter (Prison Break, A Man Apart)
 Dave Scott, triathlete, six-time Ironman Triathlon world champion
 Jonathan Segel, American composer and multi-instrumentalist
 Meredith Small, anthropologist
 Peter Siebold, member of the Scaled Composites astronaut team
 Colby Slater, American rugby union player, Olympic gold-medal winner
 Sean Stewart, author
 Charles Tart, parapsychologist
 Donnette Thayer, vocalist, guitarist and songwriter
 Helen Thomson, state and county politician
 Alexandria Villaseñor, climate activist
 Nick Watney, PGA Tour professional golfer
 Zach Weiner, web comic author and illustrator
 Andrew Weir, author of The Martian
 Paul Whaley, drummer for the band Blue Cheer
 Craig Wilson, water polo player and Olympian
 Mike Wise, NFL defensive end
 Lois Wolk, state politician
 Paul Wulff, former Washington State football head coach
 Steve Wynn, musician, leader of the band The Dream Syndicate
 Mariko Yamada, state politician
 Martin Yan, cooking show host
 Sophia Yin, veterinarian, animal trainer and author
 Gary Lee Yoder, musician, part of several 1960s psychedelic rock bands
 Malcolm Clemens Young, Episcopal priest, Dean of Grace Cathedral, San Francisco
 Robert Zirkin, Maryland politician

Sister cities
Davis' sister cities are:

 Huishan (Wuxi), China 
 Inuyama, Japan
 Los Baños, Philippines
 Muñoz, Philippines
 Qufu, China
 Rutilio Grande, El Salvador
 Sangju, South Korea
 Uman, Ukraine

See also

 Davis Community Church, 1800s structure, congregation
 Lake Davis, California

References

External links

 
 Yolo County Visitors Bureau – information on hotels, restaurants and attractions in Davis

Directory
 

 
Webarchive template wayback links
Nuclear-free zones in the United States
Cities in Sacramento metropolitan area
Cities in Yolo County, California
Incorporated cities and towns in California
Populated places established in 1868
1868 establishments in California
Populated places on the Sacramento River
Railway towns in California